Oranim ( or , lit. Pines) is a college of education in northern Israel. The college was founded in 1951 by the United Kibbutz Movement. It was named after the small forest of pine trees in the area. It offers BA degrees in a variety of fields in the humanities and social sciences, BSc degrees in a variety of sciences, BEd degrees in kindergarten, elementary and upper school studies, and MEd and MTeach degrees.

Notable alumni
Ruth Calderon, Talmud scholar and politician
Joshua Sobol (born 1939), playwright, writer, and director

Notable faculty
Ya'acov Dorchin
Miriam Roth (1910–2005), Israeli writer and scholar of children's books, kindergarten teacher, and educator

See also

List of universities and colleges in Israel

References

External links

College website

 
Colleges in Israel
Buildings and structures in Haifa District
Educational institutions established in 1951
Education schools in Israel
1951 establishments in Israel
Populated places in Haifa District
Populated places established in 1951
Villages in Israel